Lophosaurus dilophus, the crowned forest dragon or Indonesian forest dragon, is a large arboreal agamid lizard found in New Guinea and the Moluccan islands, Indonesia.

Description
A large, short-tailed species with heterogeneous dorsal scalation and a discontinuous vertebral crest. There are several slightly enlarged scales below the tympanum, a row of enlarged submaxillaries and a series of large, lanceolate scales on the anterior edge of the gular pouch.

The species differs from L. boydii in that it lacks large conical scales below the tympanum; it differs from L. spinipes in that it has lanceolate scales on the nuchal and dorsal crests (rather than triangular); and it differs from Hypsilurus in that it has a heterogeneous (rather than homogeneous) dorsal scalation.

Distribution
This species is found in New Guinea and the Moluccan islands, Indonesia. It is present across the entire island of New Guinea, although it appears to have an upper elevation limit of 800 metres. It has been recorded on the Moluccan islands of Aru and Kei, Batanta and Salawati in West Papua Province, Numfoor and Yapen in Papua Province, Indonesian New Guinea and Fergusson island in Milne Bay Province, Papua New Guinea. As this species appears to exhibit an association with rainforest or former rainforest, it is probably absent from the savannah of the Trans-Fly, and no records from this region are known.

Habitat and ecology
Found in lowland and mid-montane primary and secondary rainforest. It is primarily found in the forest interior and regrowth areas, and will persist in areas of garden agriculture with some trees. It is an arboreal species whose prey includes insects and small fruits.

Conservation
Although lowland rainforest in Papua New Guinea is increasingly being cleared for logging and conversion to agriculture, this species is widespread across the island and can persist in some modified habitats, so it's unlikely to be in any imminent danger.

The species is occasionally traded in small numbers from Papua Province in Indonesian New Guinea. It is not CITES-listed and is not legally protected in Indonesia, but the level of trade that has been observed appears unlikely to have a significant effect on wild populations.

Taxonomy
Additional research is needed to clarify the taxonomy of what is more than likely a complex of species.

References

Further reading
Barts, M. and Wilms, T. 2003. Die Agamen der Welt. Draco 4 (14): 4-23
Boulenger, G. A. 1885. Catalogue of the Lizards in the British Museum (Nat. Hist.) I. Geckonidae, Eublepharidae, Uroplatidae, Pygopodidae, Agamidae. London: 450 pp.
Duméril, A. M. C. and G. Bibron. 1837. Erpétologie Générale ou Histoire Naturelle Complete des Reptiles. Vol. 4. Libr. Encyclopédique Roret, Paris, 570 pp.
Gray, J. E. 1845. Catalogue of the specimens of lizards in the collection of the British Museum. Trustees of die British Museum/Edward Newman, London: xxvii + 289 pp. 
Kraus, F. 2013. Further range extensions for reptiles and amphibians from Papua New Guinea. Herpetological Review 44 (2): 277-280
Loveridge, A. 1948. New Guinean reptiles and amphibians in the Museum of Comparative Zoology and United States National Museum. Bull. Mus. Comp. Zool. Harvard 101 (2): 305–430. 
Macey, J. R., J. A. Schulte II, A. Larson, N. B. Ananjeva, Y. Wang, R. Pethiyagoda, N. Rastegar-Pouy 2000. Evaluating trans-Tethys migration: an example using acrodont lizard phylogenetics. Systematic Biology 49 (2): 233-256
Ord, T. J., D. A. Klomp, J. Garcia-Porta & M. Hagman 2015. Repeated evolution of exaggerated dewlaps and other throat morphology in lizards. J. evol. Biol., doi: 10.1111/jeb.12709.
Pieh, A. and Kirschner, A. 2004. Schädigung einer Winkelkopfagame durch Schuppenameisen. Elaphe 12 (3): 52–53.
de Rooij, N. de 1915. The Reptiles of the Indo-Australian Archipelago. I. Lacertilia, Chelonia, Emydosauria. Leiden (E. J. Brill), xiv + 384 pp.
Roux,J. 1910. Reptilien und Amphibien der Aru- und Kei-Inseln. Abh. senckenb. naturf. Ges. (Frankfurt) 33: 211–247.
Shearman, P. and Bryan, J. 2011. A bioregional analysis of the distribution of rainforest cover, deforestation and degradation in Papua New Guinea. Austral Ecology 36: 9-24.
Steiof, C. and W. Grossmann 1992. Das Portrait: Hypsilurus dilophus (Duméril & Bibron). Sauria 14 (4): 1–2.

External links 
http://www.ncbi.nlm.nih.gov/Taxonomy/Browser/wwwtax.cgi?id=118208 National Center for Biotechnology Information
http://www.eol.org/pages/1056237/overview Encyclopedia of life

Reptiles of Indonesia
Agamid lizards of New Guinea
Lophosaurus
Reptiles described in 1837
Taxa named by André Marie Constant Duméril
Taxa named by Gabriel Bibron
Fauna of the Maluku Islands